The Godfather of Green Bay is a fictional comedic movie released in 2005.  It follows the tale of stand-up comedian Joe Keegan (played by Pete Schwaba).  Joe makes a last-ditch effort to save his career by traveling to a small  Wisconsin town where a scout for The Tonight Show is in the audience at "Rocktoberfest".

The Godfather of Green Bay refers to a particularly difficult audience member named Big Jake Norquist (played by Tony Goldwyn) at Joe's final performance, who just so happens to be interested in Joe's girlfriend.

The film was produced in 2003 with filming locations in Marinette, Wisconsin and Menominee, Michigan. Pete Schwaba directed and produced in addition to starring. The film's soundtrack was provided by Kurt Neumann of BoDeans.

External links

 http://www.godfatherofgreenbay.com/
 

2005 films
2005 comedy films
Films shot in Wisconsin
Films set in Wisconsin
Films shot in Michigan
American comedy films
2000s English-language films
2000s American films